Pork belly or  belly pork is a boneless and fatty cut of meat from the belly of a pig. Pork belly is particularly popular in Filipino, Hispanic, Chinese, Danish, Norwegian, Korean, and Thai cuisine.

Regional dishes

France
In Alsatian cuisine, pork belly is prepared as choucroute garnie.

China

In Chinese cuisine, pork belly is most often prepared by dicing and slowly braising with skin on, marination, or being cooked in its entirety. Pork belly is used to make red braised pork belly and Dongpo pork in China (sweet and sour pork is made with pork fillet).

Latin American and Caribbean
In Dominican, Colombian, Venezuelan, and Puerto Rican cuisine, pork belly strips are fried and served as part of bandeja paisa surtido (chicharrón).

Local tradition uses tocineta as one of the fillings of traditional ham bread (pan de jamón), and some use it for the typical hallacas.

Denmark
In traditional Danish cuisine, whole pork belly is prepared as flæskesteg (literally 'pork roast'), traditionally eaten at Christmas. The dish is called  (literally 'rib roast') when prepared from pork belly. It is typically oven roasted with the skin on, seasoned with salt and bay leaves. The skin turns into a crispy rind, which is eaten with the meat. Prepared in individual slices as stegt flæsk, it is the national dish of Denmark.

Germany 

In German cuisine, pork belly is used as an ingredient in schlachtplatte.

Italy
In Italian cuisine, pancetta derives from pork belly.

Korea

The word  in  means 'five', referring to the five-layered pork belly meat with the skin.

According to a 2006 survey by National Agricultural Cooperative Federation, 85% of South Korean adults stated that their favourite slice of pork is the pork belly. The survey also showed 70% of recipients eat the meat at least once a week. The high popularity of pork belly makes it one of the most expensive parts of pork. South Korea imports wholesale pork belly from Belgium, the Netherlands, and other countries for price stabilization, as imported pork, is much cheaper than domestic. The South Korean government planned to import 70,000 tons of pork belly with no tariff in the second half year of 2011. Thus, the importation of pork belly was expected to expand.

Pork belly is consumed both at restaurants and home, grilled at Korean barbecue, or used as an ingredient for many Korean dishes, such as bossam (boiled pork wraps) and kimchi-jjigae (kimchi stew).

Samgyeop-sal-gui or  refers to the gui (grilled dish) of pork belly. Slices of pork belly meat are usually grilled, not marinated or seasoned. It is often marinated with garlic and accompanied by soju. Usually, diners grill the meat themselves and eat directly from a grill. It is typically served with ssamjang (wrap sauce) and ssam (wrap) vegetables such as lettuce and perilla leaves to wrap it in.

Netherlands 

Norway 
In Norwegian cuisine, pork belly is eaten by 55% of the population for Christmas dinner as of 2014. The tradition is to cook it slowly in the oven with the skin on and serve it accompanied by potatoes, medisterkake (pork meatballs similar to frikadeller), sausages, and lingonberry jam, as well as stewed cabbage (surkål), comparable to sauerkraut. The crispiness of the pork rind is considered vital to the pork belly.

Okinawa Prefecture
In Okinawan cuisine, rafute is traditionally eaten for longevity.

Philippines

In Filipino cuisine, pork belly is marinated in a mixture of crushed garlic, vinegar, salt, and pepper before being grilled. It is then served with soy sauce and vinegar or vinegar with garlic. Being seasoned, deep-fried, and served by being chopped into pieces is called lechon kawali.

Switzerland
In Swiss cuisine, pork belly is used as an ingredient in the Berner Platte.

Thailand
In Thai cuisine, pork belly is called  (lit: 'three-layered pork') refers to rind, fat and meat, often used to make Khao mu daeng and Khao mu krop, or fried with kale.

United Kingdom
In British cuisine, pork belly is primarily cooked using two methods. For slow roast pork belly, the meat is baked at a moderate temperature for up to three hours to tenderize it, coupled with periods of approximately twenty minutes at a high temperature at the beginning or end of the cooking period to harden off the rind or "crackling". For a barbecued pork belly, the meat is seasoned and slow-cooked in a pan by indirect heat on a covered barbecue, on a bed of mixed vegetables to which (hard) cider is added. Heat is again varied to produce tender meat with hard crackling. Pork belly is also used in the UK to make streaky bacon.

United States
In American cuisine, bacon is most often made from pork bellies. Salt pork is made from pork bellies also, which is commonly used for making soups and stews.

Futures
The pork belly futures contract became an icon of futures and commodities trading. It is frequently used as a pars pro toto for commodities in general and appears in several depictions of the arena in popular entertainment, such as the 1974 film For Pete's Sake and the 1983 film Trading Places. Inaugurated on August 18, 1961, on the Chicago Mercantile Exchange (CME), frozen pork belly futures were developed as a risk management device to meet the needs of meat packers who processed pork and had to contend with volatile hog prices, as well as price risks on processed products held in inventory. The futures contracts were useful in guiding inventories and establishing forward pricing. The unit of trading was 20 short tons of frozen, trimmed bellies. Pork bellies can be kept in cold storage for an extended period, and generally, the frozen bellies were most actively traded. Spot prices varied depending on the amount of inventory in cold storage and the seasonal demand for bacon, and the origin of the pork. In the past, the former drove the prices of the futures as well.

In more recent years, pork belly futures' prominence declined; eventually, they were among the least-traded contracts on the CME and were delisted for trading on July 18, 2011.

See also

References

External links

Cuts of pork
Commodity markets
World cuisine